Darmstadt was bombed a number of times during World War II. The most devastating air raid on Darmstadt occurred on the night of 11/12 September 1944 when No. 5 Group of the Royal Air Force (RAF) bombed the city. 66,000 of the 110,000 inhabitants of Darmstadt at the time became homeless. Darmstadt lost between 12,500 and 13,500 inhabitants during World War II.  The calligraphic memorial Darmstädter Brandnamen lists about 4,000 names. Darmstadt had several major industrial targets including Merck and Rohm and Haas chemical works as well as military communications networks.

Minor raids
On the night of 23/24 September 1943 Darmstadt was bombed by 21 Avro Lancasters and 8 De Havilland Mosquitos of No. 8 Group RAF as a diversionary raid to draw night fighters away from the main 628-aircraft raid on Mannheim.

On the night of 24/25 April 1944, some RAF planes bombed Darmstadt and other towns when, due to low cloud, they failed to find the main target of the night which was Karlsruhe.

An attack on the night of 25/26 August 1944 by No. 5 Group RAF failed when the Master Bomber had to return to base and his deputies were shot down en route. The pathfinder "Illuminating Force" flares fell too far west. As a result, most of the Main Force did not bomb at all, with some diverting to bomb Rüsselsheim instead. The few bombs which hit the town hit 95 buildings and killed 8 people.

Following the main raid another diversionary raid by 4 Mosquitos was made on the night of 23/24 February 1945 to draw night fighters away from the main target of Pforzheim.

Main raid

The main raid on Darmstadt was by No. 5 Group RAF on the night of the 11/12 September 1944, when 226 Lancasters and 14 Mosquitos were directed to the medieval city centre, as houses there were mainly built of wood. The raid was to incorporate a new technique where, instead of bombers flying along a single path across the target, the bombers would bomb along a fan of paths over the city. The intention was to deliberately spread the bombload. The attack started a fierce fire in the centre and in the districts immediately to the south and east. The destruction of dwellings in this area was almost complete. The RAF lost 12 Lancasters, 5.3 per cent of the bomber force, having encountered an unusually large number of German fighters.

Among industries known  to the RAF in Darmstadt, the Rohm and Haas chemical works was not destroyed, while the E. Merck chemical works was badly damaged, and additional damage resulted in a loss of production of about 1 months work by the local metal production and fabrication industry.

Royal Air Force Bomber Command 60th Anniversary Campaign Diary for September 1944 states:The Darmstadt raid, with its extensive fire destruction and its heavy casualties, was held by the Germans to be an extreme example of RAF 'terror bombing' and remains a sensitive subject because of the claimed absence of any major industries in the city. Bomber Command defended the raid by pointing out the railway communications passing through Darmstadt; the directive for the offensive against German communications had not yet been issued to Bomber Command, although advance notice of the directive may have been received. Darmstadt was simply one of Germany's medium-sized cities of lesser importance which succumbed to Bomber Command's improving area-attack techniques in the last months of the war when many of the larger cities were no longer worth bombing.

References

Bibliography

External links
 The mass grave and memorial site at the Darmstadt Waldfriedhof (cemetery)
 Pictures of the destroyed city (local newspaper: Darmstädter Echo)
 Durmstädter (sic) Brandnamen: a calligraphic memorial

Darmstadt
1944 in Germany
Conflicts in 1944
Darmstadt
Darmstadt
Germany–United Kingdom military relations
1940s in Hesse